Fred Mukasa Mbidde (born 15 October 1974) is a Ugandan lawyer, human-rights activist, mass communication specialist, motivational speaker and politician. He is an elected member of the 3rd East African Legislative Assembly (EALA), representing the Republic of Uganda. He has been in this office since June 2012. He serves on three EALA committees: the Committee on Communication, Trade and Investments; the Committee on Legal, Rules and Privileges; and the Committee on Regional Affairs and Conflict Resolution. He is the chairperson of the Committee on Communication, Trade and Investments.

He is a member, a former chief legal advisor, the chairman Masaka district and the current national vice president of the Democratic Party, (DP). He is also a member of the Pan African Lawyers Union and the Coalition for an Effective African Court on Human and Peoples' Rights (African Court Coalition).

He first gained prominence in 2001 when serving as the Guild President for  Makerere University. He played a significant role in the "Save Mabira Riots" that took place in Uganda in the year 2007. Also, Mbidde played a noteworthy role in the 1994 liberation war of Rwanda. He is the Patron of the Mbidde Foundation and the reigning attorney general for Kooki chiefdom.

Background
Mukasa Mbidde was born in Masaka District on 15 October 1973 as the second born of the late Emmanuel Mbidde, a former headmaster and Ms. Mary Kintu, now a retired teacher. A Muganda by tribe, he was born in a Christian family of the Ente clan. Two of his siblings are Henry Mbidde and Balaam Mbidde both of whom are lecturers at Makerere University. He had some military training in the 1990s and played a noteworthy role in the 1994 liberation war of Rwanda when he fought alongside the Rwandan Patriotic Army (RPA) before joining University in 1999.

He has been his own boss over the years and has run businesses that include among others, The Financial Times newspaper (1999–2000), a Forex bureau (1999 to-date), a Radio Station in Rwanda, a law firm Mbidde & Co Advocates (2011 to-date), the Mbidde Foundation headquartered in Nagoya, Japan etc. He is friends with many Japanese and these have supported his programs for many years through the Mbidde Foundation.

Education
Mukasa Mbidde attended Nakyenyi Primary School, a school where his mother taught, for his primary education and Kabwoko High School for his middle school education. He attended Masuliita Boarding School and Kampala High School for his high school education. He attended Makerere University and Law Development Centre (LDC) for his higher education. He holds a Mass Communication degree (2003) from Makerere University, an LLB (2009) from Makerere University and a postgraduate Diploma in Legal Practice (Dip.Leg.Pract) (2010) from Law Development Centre. He also had leadership training at the Norwegian School of Leadership and Theology (HLT) in 2005. In 2014, Mbidde had a legal engagement in Practice in Sub-regional Courts at the Mandela Institute, University of the Witwatersrand.

Junior political career
Mukasa Mbidde began his involvement in politics in 1999 as a member of the Uganda Young Democrats (UYD), the junior wing of the Democratic Party. He served as the deputy treasurer for the party and then as the secretary for Students' Affairs. He stood for the Makerere University guild presidency in 2001 on the UYD ticket and won in all polling stations for a number of reasons. His predecessor was Asuman Basalirwa and his successor was Denis Okema.

Why he won the guild presidency
Firstly, he had the finances since he was much older than his competitors at the time and had run a number of businesses prior to his tenure at Makerere university.
Secondly, he belonged to the correct group at the time. He was a member of a winning party (UYD).
Thirdly, his speeches were philosophical in nature because of his good background in literature and mass Communication, a course he was pursuing at the time. He won a Makerere University Certificate in The Art of Public Speaking.
Also, the girls voted him for his looks and the fact that they thought he was driving the best car at the university campus at the time. It was a red 1998 Saab 900 convertible.
Finally, his crosscutting nature made it impossible for students to know his exact tribe and hence voted him confusedly.

Why he's the most noteworthy guild president of the 2000s
He advocated for and succeeded in the sponsorship of all female students with the automatic addition of 1.5 bonus points to every girl student upon admission. This created a balance between the number of girls admitted to Makerere University and that of boys who were the overwhelming majority before then. 
He advocated for and succeeded in the creation of the Makerere University ICT Institute with the successful acquisition of the necessary funds from the Government of Norway.
Being a mass communication student, he started Campus FM, the Makerere University run radio station. Though that was noteworthy, Mukasa Mbidde is still bothered by the fact that his differences with the then editor in chief of The Makererean, the university run newspaper, made him the only guild president in the 2000s not to publish the university weekly in his reign.
There was no strike during his time as guild president because of his superb negotiation skills whenever there was a strike scare.
He created the Ministry for Private Students Affairs to handle the issues of the then neglected privately sponsored academicians. These were looked at as second class scholars at the time and so did not have the same privileges as Government sponsored students. The ministry helped change that perception in a positive way.
He improved the security situation by advocating for and succeeding in the removal of old fashioned hall of residence guards who were then using bows and arrows and replaced them with the current Makerere University Army that use guns and wear green uniform, the color of his political party.
To further improve security at the University, he advocated for and succeeded in the creation of a perimeter fence around the university campus. 
He improved the sanitation issue at the University campus by replacing the then smelly and neglected gigantic garbage heap that was between Makerere University School of Law and CCE Complex Ladies Hall with the now famous Club Five, a student recreation facility at the university. The gigantic garbage heap was then a home for madmen, drunkards and rapists.
Mukasa Mbidde also started the annual Japan-Uganda Students Conference at Makerere University among others.

It was against that background that:
He was given the title of Otak Olweny (meaning fighter) and the name Okello by the Acholi Makerere University Students Association (AMUSA) and the Acholi Sub-region elders.
Also, he received Japanese Recognition Awards from Chiba University and Soka University in 2002.
Finally, he won the 2001 American Council of Young Political Leaders (ACYPL) award, an accolade given to young political leaders annually by the American Council.

Senior political career
After his guild presidency, he went on to become the National UYD Vice President in 2005. In 2006, he became the National Deputy Campaigning Director for the senior wing of the Democratic Party. He was deputizing Norbert Mao at the time. He was a candidate in the 2007 parliamentary by-elections for Kalungu East county, Masaka district but lost in controversial circumstances and to-date still blames President Yoweri Museveni's involvement for the loss. He also stood in the 2011 parliamentary elections for the same constituency and lost but this time contentedly.

Having failed to go to parliament in 2011, Mbidde saw a loophole in Uganda's East African Legislative Assembly (EALA) representation which then favored the ruling party, the National Resistance Movement, and so sought court redress and lobbied for the inclusion of more opposition party members. On succeeding in court, he was voted in on the DP ticket though in controversial circumstances and has been an EALA MP since June 2012. He serves on three EALA committees, the Committee on Communication, Trade and Investments,  the Committee on Legal, Rules and Privileges and the Committee on Regional Affairs and Conflict Resolution. He is the chairperson of the Committee on Communication, Trade and Investments. He also heads the sub committee on legal, rules and privileges. Also, he is the head of the Speaker's legal board and the head of East African Sub-regional human rights practitioners.

Bills tabled, supported or unsupported
In January 2013, Mbidde said he was to petition the EALA assembly to declare Museveni's actions in Uganda where he clashed with his parliament, incompatible with his status as the bloc's chair. President Museveni had been on the offensive at the time against parliament since the botched investigations into the death of Butaleja Woman MP Cerinah Nebanda who died under questionable circumstances on December 20, 2012.
In April 2013, Mbidde passed a motion in support of the proposal that SADC and the UN Security Council resolutions for an "offensive international peacekeeping force" against the M23 rebels be kept in abeyance to give dialogue a chance.
In June 2013, Mbidde stopped by petition the admission of South Sudan into the East African Community (EAC). He had earlier on been quoted saying "I am going to table the bill to block South Sudan from joining EAC if that country fails to adhere to my plea. The murder of innocent Ugandans cannot go on unchallenged."
In March 2014, Mbidde successfully filed a petition before the East African Court of Justice seeking orders to stop anybody from drafting a motion to censure Margaret Zziwa, the EALA Speaker.
In March 2015, the Committee on Communication, Trade and Investments which is chaired by Mbidde passed a bill on elimination of non-tariff barriers, the EAC Elimination of Non-Tariff Barriers Bill, 2015.

Legal career
Mukasa Mbidde has been a practicing lawyer from 2011 to-date. He is a member of the Uganda Law Society, the East African Law Society, the Pan African Lawyers Union and the Coalition for an Effective African Court on Human and Peoples' Rights (African Court Coalition). He is a visiting lecturer at Soka University, Chiba University and Kyoritsu Women's University in Japan. He is a consultant for Kenya Human-rights Commission in Freedom of Movement. His specialty areas are the Law of Treaties, Corporate Financing, Mergers and Acquisitions as well as Conveyancing and Trademarks.

He runs a private law firm in the names of Mbidde & Co Advocates and the Mbidde Foundation of which he is the patron is also a legal based NGO. He usually has joint instructions on high-profile cases with Justin Semuyaba of  Semuyaba Yiga & Co Advocates. He has been the brain behind many of the cases filed by Uganda's Democratic Party, he being the Chief Legal Advisor of the political party. His practice of late has been inclined to Sub-regional courts especially the East African Court of Justice (EACJ), the highlight of this being his 2011 EALA case in the aforesaid court.

Philanthropy
Mukasa Mbidde is a philanthropist in Uganda. He sponsored elections of ten or so members of parliament in Uganda. He is a co-sponsor of the activities of Uganda's Democratic Party as well as the Catholic Church in Uganda. His passion for boxing has made him generous in his sponsoring of a number of boxing clubs in the country. Being a lawyer, he has often offered pro bono litigation to indigent clients and has often assisted diaspora members in land matters. Recently, Mbidde was recognized by KCCA for co-sponsoring the construction of a newly erected Kabaka monument at the historical Kabaka Njagala road junction in Mengo.

Controversies
Mukasa Mbidde has been involved in a number of controversies from his fighting alongside Kagame's Rwandan Patriotic Army (RPA) in the 1990s to his support of Margaret ZZiwa, the former EALA Speaker. His loss in the 2007 Kalungu East parliamentary elections came with allegations of vote rigging masterminded by President Yoweri Museveni as punishment for Mbidde's role in the 2007 Save Mabira Riots in Kampala in which two Ugandan men and an Indian man were killed and 40 Indians evacuated from a Hindu temple.

Mukasa Mbidde also caused controversy when he supported Norbert Mao a non Muganda for the DP presidency and further is believed to have been instrumental to his coming into office of president for a political party that was founded on Buganda and Roman Catholic roots. His election to EALA was also punctuated by opposition strategic disagreements which led to the exclusion of FDC, the largest opposition party in Uganda's parliament. It is alleged that given his then filed new Application No4 of 2012 before the East African Court of Justice made the NRM, to have no alternative but to vote for Mbidde for the resultant effect of saving the elections from court nullification and this in the end worked to foil the FDC-led plot to boycott the elections.

Personal details
Mukasa Mbidde was married to the late Susan Namaganda, the former Woman MP for Bukomansimbi District, with whom he had three children. He is also a father to Gabrielle Mbidde. He is close friends with about six EALA MPs that include among others Dr. James Ndahiro and Dr. Abdu Karim Harelimana of Rwanda, Hafsa Mossi of Burundi, Peter Mutuku Mathuki of Kenya,  Nyerere Charles Makongoro of Tanzania and Suzan Nakawuki of Uganda.

See also
East African Legislative Assembly
Bukomansimbi District
Masaka District

References

External links
 Members of the 3rd EALA (Current Members)
 Coalition for an Effective African Court on Human and Peoples' Rights
 To keep or end 1.5 free points for varsity girls?
 1.5 female bonus leaves boys crying
 Club 5, Makerere University
 CAMPUS VIBE: Uproar as Makerere privatizes bookshop, canteen, printery
 Japanese Government MEXT Scholarships 2015
 ACYPL
 The Makererean
 Members of the 3rd EALA (Current Members)
 Zziwa censure: EALA members under fire

Living people
1973 births
21st-century Ugandan lawyers
Ugandan motivational speakers
Members of the East African Legislative Assembly
Democratic Party (Uganda) politicians
Makerere University alumni
Law Development Centre alumni
People from Masaka District